Liu Lantao (November 1910 – 31 December 1997) was a Chinese Communist revolutionary and politician of the People's Republic of China.

Early life
Liu was born in Shaanxi Province in 1910. After participating in the May Thirtieth Movement of 1925 at the age of 14, Liu joined the Communist Youth League of China in 1926 and the Chinese Communist Party in September 1928 at the age of 17. Liu and fellow communist Liu Zhidan organized a resistance movement to the Kuomintang in northern Shaanxi. In August 1930, Liu was captured and imprisoned. After his release, he went to Hebei Province, where he was betrayed, captured a second time and imprisoned in Beiping alongside An Ziwen and Bo Yibo. In September 1936, Liu and others were freed following the efforts of the communist underground, and he started work in Tianjin.

Sino-Japanese War
At the start of the Second Sino-Japanese War, Liu went to the main communist base at the border of Shaanxi and Gansu Province. In 1938, he was sent to the border area of Shanxi, Hebei and Chahar Province to assist Peng Zhen and Nie Rongzhen. In 1944, he arrived in Yan'an to serve as an alternate member of the 7th Central Committee of the Chinese Communist Party.

Chinese Civil War
At the start of the second phase of the Chinese Civil War, Liu assisted the communist leadership in transferring from northern Shaanxi to the Shanxi-Hebei-Chahar base area. When the base area merged with that on the border of Shandong and Henan Province, Liu was one of those responsible for the entirety of northern China.

Post-1949
After the formation of the People's Republic of China, Liu served as a full member of the 8th Central Committee of the Chinese Communist Party. He was one of those who investigated the case of Liu Qingshan (1916-1952) and Zhang Zishan (1914-1952), two communist officials who used their positions for private gain. Liu and Zhang were both publicly executed.

At the start of the Cultural Revolution, Liu was caught up in the case of the 61 Renegades alongside Bo Yibo, An Ziwen and others. As a result, he was imprisoned for 8 years, during which time his wife committed suicide. In 1978, after his release, Liu was named vice-chair of the United Front Work Department. In July 1979, Liu was made a vice-chairman of the 5th CPPCC and in September of that was selected as a member of the 11th Central Committee of the Chinese Communist Party. He served on the Central Advisory Commission from September 1982 to September 1992. He was made a vice-chairman of the 6th CPPCC in June 1983.

Liu died in Beijing on 31 December 1997.

References

西北局第一书记刘澜涛整肃习仲勋胡耀邦内情
原西北局第一书记刘澜涛整人的真面
刘澜涛同志生平 原载《光明日报》

1910 births
1997 deaths
People's Republic of China politicians from Shaanxi
Chinese Communist Party politicians from Shaanxi
Alternate members of the 7th Central Committee of the Chinese Communist Party
Members of the 8th Central Committee of the Chinese Communist Party
Members of the 11th Central Committee of the Chinese Communist Party
Vice Chairpersons of the National Committee of the Chinese People's Political Consultative Conference
61 Renegades